Carl Bernard Bartels (1866 – 1955) was a sculptor.

Bartels, a wood carver from Stuttgart, Germany, moved to Britain after visiting the country during his honeymoon in 1887.

In the early years of the twentieth century, while living and working in Harringay, London, Bartels entered and won a national competition to design the Liver Birds which stand on the top of Walter Aubrey Thomas's Royal Liver Building on the Pier Head in central Liverpool. Designed by Bartels, the iconic Liver Birds were constructed by the Bromsgrove Guild.

During the First World War, Bartels was imprisoned in an internment camp on the Isle of Man, even though he had been a naturalised Briton for 27 years. After the war Bartels was repatriated to Germany, leaving behind his wife and 2 English born children in England.

Bartels returned to the United Kingdom and lived and worked in Harringay until his death in 1955, producing carvings for Durham Cathedral, various stately homes and even making artificial limbs during the Second World War.

References

External links 
 CARL BERNARD BARTELS, Creator of Liverpool's Liver Birds

1866 births
1955 deaths
German sculptors
German male sculptors
Bartels Carl
20th-century British sculptors
19th-century British sculptors
British male sculptors
19th-century German male artists
19th-century British male artists
20th-century British male artists